Gabriela Sabatini was the defending champion, but lost in the final to Conchita Martínez. The score was 7–5, 6–1.

Seeds
The first eight seeds received a bye to the second round.

Draw

Finals

Top half

Section 1

Section 2

Bottom half

Section 3

Section 4

References

External links
 Official results archive (ITF)
 Official results archive (WTA)

Italian Open - Womens Singles, 1993
1993 Italian Open (tennis)